The 62nd Annual Grammy Awards ceremony was held on January 26, 2020, at the Staples Center in Los Angeles. It recognized the best recordings, compositions, and artists of the eligibility year, running from October 1, 2018, to August 31, 2019. Alicia Keys hosted the ceremony, having hosted the previous year's ceremony as well.

Lizzo received the most nominations of any artist with eight, followed by Billie Eilish and Lil Nas X with six each. Finneas received the most awards with six. Eilish became the first artist to win the four major categories of Record of the Year, Album of the Year, Song of the Year, and Best New Artist in the same year since Christopher Cross in 1981.

Ten days prior to the ceremony, Recording Academy president Deborah Dugan was relieved of her duties as president and CEO and placed on administrative leave from the organization. She sparked controversy by claiming that the organization engaged in corruption and favoritism; Champagne Billecart-Salmon responded by pulling their ads from the broadcast, and Megyn Kelly, Gabrielle Union, and others tweeted their support of Dugan. The ceremony was held on the same day as the death of basketball player Kobe Bryant, to whose memory Keys and Boyz II Men dedicated their performance of "It's So Hard to Say Goodbye to Yesterday".

Background and controversy
After many years of being traditionally held in February (except during the years of the Winter Olympics), the 62nd Grammy Awards ceremony was moved to the last Sunday in January, following the Academy Awards' decision to move their 2020 ceremony to the second Sunday in February. Nominations were announced in all 84 categories by Gayle King, Alicia Keys, and Bebe Rexha on the set of CBS This Morning on November 20, 2019.

This was set to be the first edition of the Grammy Awards that the new Recording Academy president Deborah Dugan would have presided over; however, she was relieved of her duties as president and CEO and placed on administrative leave from the organization ten days before the ceremony. The Academy launched an investigation into allegations that Dugan bullied an assistant. After her dismissal, Dugan sparked controversy by claiming that the Recording Academy engaged in favoritism and corruption during the Grammy nomination process. Taylor Swift reportedly cancelled a planned surprise performance of her song "The Man" at the ceremony in solidarity with Dugan, although both Swift and Grammys producer Ken Ehrlich denied this. Recording Academy Chairman Harvey Mason Jr. took over as interim president and chief executive officer and presided over the ceremony instead of Dugan.

The ceremony was held at the Staples Center on the same day as the death of basketball player Kobe Bryant, who played for the Los Angeles Lakers — the arena is the team's home venue. Several tributes to Bryant were included in the ceremony, including a performance of "It's So Hard to Say Goodbye to Yesterday" by host Alicia Keys and Boyz II Men, while Lil Nas X, Lizzo and DJ Khaled all incorporated tributes to Bryant into their performances.

Category changes

For the 62nd Annual Grammy Awards, multiple categories were changed.

 As of the 62nd Grammy Awards, the Recording Academy would accept links to streaming services as opposed to physical copies as submissions. The Academy stated: "For most categories, we would prefer streaming distribution links for online entry submissions, though CD submissions remain optional". As justification for this development, the Academy highlighted the changing music industry and added that submitting links was more convenient and cost effective, especially for smaller and independent labels.
 Additionally, there were separate screening committees for Pop and Rock, whereas previously these categories were screened by a Core Committee. This leaves the Core Committee to focus on the more difficult decisions such as determining who is eligible for the Best New Artist category and trying to find the best home for borderline genre entries.
 The definition of the Grammy Award for Best Traditional Pop Vocal Album had been expanded to accept "contemporary pop songs performed in traditional pop style – the term "traditional" being a reference to the style of the composition, vocal styling and the instrumental arrangement without regard to the age of the material". The Academy stated that broadening the category was done in an attempt to allow it to "remain robust and inclusive" and enable it to be more competitive as, for example, Tony Bennett has won the award 13 times.
 Spoken word recordings targeted at children had been moved from the Best Children's Album category to the Best Spoken Word Album.
 As of the 62nd Grammy Awards, Spanish-language Latin Gospel and Christian music would be officially welcomed in the Best Gospel Album, Best Contemporary Christian Music Album, Best Roots Gospel Album, Best Gospel Performance/Song and Best Contemporary Christian Music Performance/Song categories.

Performers

Premiere ceremony

Main ceremony

Presenters 
Premiere ceremony
Imogen Heap – hosted the Grammy Premiere Ceremony, presented Visual Media, World Music, American Roots, Pop and Producer categories
Kimie Miner – presented Packaging, Notes, Historical, Engineering, Remixer, Surround Sound and Music Video/Film categories
Esperanza Spalding – presented New Age, American Roots, Reggae, Children's, Spoken Word, Dance and Contemporary Instrumental categories
Luis Fonsi – presented Composing, Arranging, Jazz and Country categories
PJ Morton – presented Gospel, Latin and Rap categories
Natalia Joachim – presented Classical categories
Jimmy Jam – presented Musical Theatre, Rock, Alternative and R&B categories

Main ceremony

 Billy Porter – introduced the Jonas Brothers
 Keith Urban & Cynthia Erivo – presented Best Pop Solo Performance 
 Trevor Noah – introduced Tyler, the Creator
 Shania Twain & Bebe Rexha – presented Best Country Duo/Group Performance
 Jim Gaffigan – introduced Camila Cabello
 Brandi Carlile & Tanya Tucker – presented Best Comedy Album
 Ben Platt – introduced Ariana Grande
 Common – introduced Aerosmith & Run-DMC
 Issa Rae – presented Best Rap Album
 Ellen DeGeneres – introduced Lil Nas X
 Greta Gerwig – introduced Demi Lovato
 Ava DuVernay – introduced the Tribute to Nipsey Hussle
 Smokey Robinson & Little Big Town – presented Song of the Year
 Ozzy & Sharon Osbourne – presented Best Rap/Sung Performance & introduced H.E.R.
 Alicia Keys & Dua Lipa – presented Best New Artist
 John Legend – introduced the Tribute to Kenneth Ehrlich
 LL Cool J – presented Album of the Year
 Alicia Keys – presented Record of the Year
Notes
 Stevie Wonder was announced as a presenter, but did not appear at the ceremony.

Winners and nominees 

The nominees and winners (denoted in bold) for the 62nd annual Grammy Awards were as follows:

General field 

Record of the Year

 "Bad Guy" – Billie Eilish
Finneas O'Connell, producer; Rob Kinelski & Finneas O'Connell, engineers/mixers; John Greenham, mastering engineer
 "Hey, Ma" - Bon Iver
 Brad Cook, Chris Messina & Justin Vernon, producers; Zach Hansen & Chris Messina, engineers/mixers; Greg Calbi, mastering engineer
 "7 Rings" – Ariana Grande
Charles Anderson, Tommy Brown, Michael Foster & Victoria Monét, producers; Serban Ghenea, John Hanes, Billy Hickey & Brendan Morawski, engineers/mixers; Randy Merrill, mastering engineer
 "Hard Place" – H.E.R.
Rodney "Darkchild" Jerkins, producer; Joseph Hurtado, Jaycen Joshua, Derek Keota & Miki Tsutsumi, engineers/mixers; Colin Leonard, mastering engineer
 "Talk" – Khalid
Disclosure & Denis Kosiak, producers; Ingmar Carlson, Jon Castelli, Josh Deguzman, John Kercy, Denis Kosiak, Guy Lawrence & Michael Romero, engineers/mixers; Dale Becker, mastering engineer
 "Old Town Road" – Lil Nas X featuring Billy Ray Cyrus
Andrew "VoxGod" Bolooki, Jocelyn "Jozzy" Donald & YoungKio, producers; Andrew "VoxGod" Bolooki & Cinco, engineers/mixers; Eric Lagg, mastering engineer
 "Truth Hurts" – Lizzo
Ricky Reed & Tele, producers; Chris Galland, Manny Marroquin & Ethan Shumaker, engineers/mixers; Chris Gehringer, mastering engineer
 "Sunflower" – Post Malone & Swae Lee
Louis Bell & Carter Lang, producers; Louis Bell & Manny Marroquin, engineers/mixers; Mike Bozzi, mastering engineer

Album of the Year

 When We All Fall Asleep, Where Do We Go? – Billie EilishFinneas O'Connell, producer; Rob Kinelski & Finneas O'Connell, engineers/mixers; Billie Eilish & Finneas O'Connell, songwriters; John Greenham, mastering engineer I, I – Bon Iver
 Brad Cook, Chris Messina & Justin Vernon, producers; Zach Hansen & Chris Messina, engineers/mixers; BJ Burton, Brad Cook & Justin Vernon, songwriters; Greg Calbi, mastering engineer
 Norman Fucking Rockwell! – Lana Del Rey
Jack Antonoff & Lana Del Rey, producers; Jack Antonoff & Laura Sisk, engineers/mixers; Jack Antonoff & Lana Del Rey, songwriters; Chris Gehringer, mastering engineer
 Thank U, Next – Ariana Grande
Tommy Brown, Ilya, Max Martin & Victoria Monét, producers; Serban Ghenea, Sam Holland & Brendan Morawski, engineers/mixers; Tommy Brown, Ariana Grande, Savan Kotecha, Max Martin, Victoria Monét, Tayla Parx & Ilya Salmanzadeh, songwriters; Randy Merrill, mastering engineer
 I Used to Know Her – H.E.R.
 David "Swagg R'Celious" Harris, H.E.R., Walter Jones & Jeff Robinson, producers; Miki Tsutsumi, engineer/mixer; Sam Ashworth, Jeff "Gitty" Gitelman, David "Swagg R'Celious" Harris & H.E.R., songwriters; Dave Kutch, mastering engineer
 7 – Lil Nas X
Montero Lamar Hill, songwriter; Eric Lagg, mastering engineer
 Cuz I Love You (Deluxe) – Lizzo
Ricky Reed, producer; Manny Marroquin & Ethan Shumaker, engineers/mixers; Eric Frederic & Melissa Jefferson, songwriters; Chris Gehringer, mastering engineer
Father of the Bride – Vampire Weekend
Ezra Koenig & Ariel Rechtshaid, producers; John DeBold, Chris Kasych, Takemasa Kosaka, Ariel Rechtshaid & Hiroya Takayama, engineers/mixers; Ezra Koenig, songwriter; Emily Lazar, mastering engineer

Song of the Year

 "Bad Guy" Billie Eilish O'Connell & Finneas O'Connell, songwriters (Billie Eilish)"Always Remember Us This Way"
Natalie Hemby, Lady Gaga, Hillary Lindsey & Lori McKenna, songwriters (Lady Gaga)
 "Bring My Flowers Now"
Brandi Carlile, Phil Hanseroth, Tim Hanseroth & Tanya Tucker, songwriters (Tanya Tucker)
 "Hard Place"
Ruby Amanfu, Sam Ashworth, D. Arcelious Harris, H.E.R. & Rodney Jerkins, songwriters (H.E.R.)
 "Lover"
 Taylor Swift, songwriter (Taylor Swift) 
 "Norman Fucking Rockwell"
Jack Antonoff & Lana Del Rey, songwriters (Lana Del Rey)
 "Someone You Loved"
 Tom Barnes, Lewis Capaldi, Pete Kelleher, Benjamin Kohn & Sam Roman, songwriters (Lewis Capaldi)
 "Truth Hurts"
 Steven Cheung, Eric Frederic, Melissa Jefferson & Jesse Saint John, songwriters (Lizzo)Best New Artist Billie Eilish Black Pumas
 Lil Nas X
 Lizzo
 Maggie Rogers
 Rosalía
 Tank and the Bangas
 Yola

 Pop Best Pop Solo Performance "Truth Hurts" – Lizzo "Spirit" – Beyoncé
 "Bad Guy" – Billie Eilish
 "7 Rings" – Ariana Grande
 "You Need to Calm Down" – Taylor SwiftBest Pop Duo/Group Performance "Old Town Road" – Lil Nas X featuring Billy Ray Cyrus "Boyfriend" – Ariana Grande and Social House
 "Sucker"  – Jonas Brothers
 "Sunflower"  – Post Malone & Swae Lee
 "Señorita" – Shawn Mendes & Camila CabelloBest Traditional Pop Vocal Album Look Now – Elvis Costello & The Imposters Sì – Andrea Bocelli
 Love (Deluxe Edition) – Michael Bublé
 A Legendary Christmas – John Legend
 Walls – Barbra StreisandBest Pop Vocal Album When We All Fall Asleep, Where Do We Go? – Billie Eilish The Lion King: The Gift - Beyoncé
 Thank U, Next – Ariana Grande
 No.6 Collaborations Project – Ed Sheeran
 Lover – Taylor Swift

 Dance/electronic music Best Dance Recording "Got to Keep On" – the Chemical BrothersThe Chemical Brothers, producers; Steve Dub Jones & Tom Rowlands, mixers "Linked" – Bonobo
Simon Green, producer; Bonobo, mixer
 "Piece of Your Heart" – Meduza featuring Goodboys
 Simone Giani, Luca De Gregorio & Mattia Vitale, producers; Simone Giani, Luca De Gregorio & Mattia Vitale, mixers
 "Underwater" – Rüfüs Du Sol
Jason Evigan & Rüfüs Du Sol, producers; Cassian Stewart-Kasimba, mixer
 "Midnight Hour" – Skrillex & Boys Noize featuring Ty Dolla $ign
Boys Noize & Skrillex, producers; Skrillex, mixer

Best Dance/Electronic Album

 No Geography – The Chemical Brothers LP5 – Apparat
 Hi This Is Flume (Mixtape) – Flume
 Solace – Rüfüs Du Sol
 Weather – Tycho

 Contemporary instrumental music 
Best Contemporary Instrumental Album

 Mettavolution – Rodrigo y Gabriela Ancestral Recall – Christian Scott aTunde Adjuah
 Star People Nation – Theo Croker
 Beat Music! Beat Music! Beat Music! – Mark Guiliana
 Elevate – Lettuce

 Rock Best Rock Performance "This Land" – Gary Clark Jr. "Pretty Waste" – Bones UK
 "History Repeats" – Brittany Howard
 "Woman" – Karen O & Danger Mouse
 "Too Bad" – Rival SonsBest Metal Performance "7empest" – Tool "Astorolus – The Great Octopus" – Candlemass featuring Tony Iommi
 "Humanicide" – Death Angel
 "Bow Down" – I Prevail
 "Unleashed" – Killswitch EngageBest Rock Song "This Land"Gary Clark Jr., songwriter (Gary Clark Jr.) "Fear Inoculum"
Danny Carey, Justin Chancellor, Adam Jones & Maynard James Keenan, songwriters (Tool)
 "Give Yourself a Try"
George Daniel, Adam Hann, Matthew Healy & Ross MacDonald, songwriters (The 1975)
 "Harmony Hall"
Ezra Koenig, songwriter (Vampire Weekend)
 "History Repeats"
Brittany Howard, songwriter (Brittany Howard)Best Rock AlbumSocial Cues – Cage the ElephantAmo – Bring Me the Horizon
In the End – The Cranberries
Trauma – I Prevail
Feral Roots – Rival Sons

AlternativeBest Alternative Music AlbumFather of the Bride – Vampire WeekendU.F.O.F. – Big Thief
Assume Form – James Blake
I, I – Bon Iver
Anima – Thom Yorke

 R&B Best R&B Performance "Come Home" – Anderson .Paak featuring André 3000 "Love Again" – Daniel Caesar & Brandy
 "Could've Been" – H.E.R. featuring Bryson Tiller
 "Exactly How I Feel" – Lizzo featuring Gucci Mane
 "Roll Some Mo" – Lucky DayeBest Traditional R&B Performance "Jerome" – Lizzo "Time Today" – BJ the Chicago Kid 
 "Steady Love" – India.Arie
 "Real Games" – Lucky Daye
 "Built for Love" – PJ Morton featuring Jazmine SullivanBest R&B Song "Say So"PJ Morton, songwriter (PJ Morton featuring JoJo) "Could've Been"
Dernst Emile II, David "Swagg R’Celious" Harris, H.E.R. & Hue "Soundzfire" Strother, songwriters (H.E.R. featuring Bryson Tiller)
 "Look at Me Now"
Emily King & Jeremy Most, songwriters (Emily King)
 "No Guidance"
Chris Brown, Tyler James Bryant, Nija Charles, Aubrey Graham, Anderson Hernandez, Michee Patrick Lebrun, Joshua Lewis, Noah Shebib & Teddy Walton, songwriters (Chris Brown featuring Drake)
 "Roll Some Mo"
David Brown, Dernst Emile II & Peter Lee Johnson, songwriters (Lucky Daye)Best Urban Contemporary Album Cuz I Love You (Deluxe) – Lizzo Apollo XXI – Steve Lacy
 Overload – Georgia Anne Muldrow
 Saturn – NAO
 Being Human in Public – Jessie ReyezBest R&B Album Ventura – Anderson .Paak 1123 – BJ the Chicago Kid
 Painted – Lucky Daye
 Ella Mai – Ella Mai
 Paul – PJ Morton

 Rap Best Rap Performance "Racks in the Middle" – Nipsey Hussle featuring Roddy Ricch & Hit-Boy "Middle Child" – J. Cole
 "Suge" – DaBaby
 "Down Bad" – Dreamville featuring JID, Bas, J. Cole, EarthGang & Young Nudy
 "Clout" – Offset featuring Cardi BBest Rap/Sung Performance"Higher" – DJ Khaled featuring Nipsey Hussle & John Legend "Drip Too Hard" – Lil Baby & Gunna
 "Panini" – Lil Nas X
 "Ballin" – Mustard featuring Roddy Ricch
 "The London" – Young Thug featuring J. Cole & Travis ScottBest Rap Song "A Lot" Jermaine Cole, Dacoury Natche, 21 Savage & Anthony White, songwriters (21 Savage featuring J. Cole) "Bad Idea"
Chancelor Bennett, Cordae Dunston, Uforo Ebong & Daniel Hackett, songwriters (YBN Cordae featuring Chance the Rapper)
 "Gold Roses"
 Noel Cadastre, Aubrey Graham, Anderson Hernandez, Khristopher Riddick-Tynes, William Leonard Roberts II, Joshua Quinton Scruggs, Leon Thomas III & Ozan Yildirim, songwriters (Rick Ross featuring Drake)
 "Racks in the Middle"
 Ermias Asghedom, Dustin James Corbett, Greg Allen Davis, Chauncey Hollis Jr. & Rodrick Moore, songwriters (Nipsey Hussle featuring Roddy Ricch & Hit-Boy)
 "Suge"
 DaBaby, Jetsonmade & Pooh Beatz, songwriters (DaBaby)Best Rap AlbumIGOR – Tyler, the CreatorRevenge of the Dreamers III – Dreamville
 Championships – Meek Mill
 I Am > I Was – 21 Savage
 The Lost Boy – YBN Cordae

 Country Best Country Solo Performance "Ride Me Back Home" – Willie Nelson "All Your'n" – Tyler Childers
 "Girl Goin' Nowhere" – Ashley McBryde
 "God's Country" – Blake Shelton
 "Bring My Flowers Now" – Tanya TuckerBest Country Duo/Group Performance "Speechless" - Dan + Shay "Brand New Man" – Brooks & Dunn with Luke Combs
 "I Don't Remember Me (Before You)" – Brothers Osborne
 "The Daughters" – Little Big Town
 "Common" – Maren Morris featuring Brandi CarlileBest Country Song "Bring My Flowers Now" Brandi Carlile, Phil Hanseroth, Tim Hanseroth & Tanya Tucker, songwriters (Tanya Tucker) "Girl Goin' Nowhere"
 Jeremy Bussey & Ashley McBryde, songwriters (Ashley McBryde)
 "It All Comes Out in the Wash"
 Miranda Lambert, Hillary Lindsey, Lori McKenna & Liz Rose, songwriters (Miranda Lambert)
 "Some of It"
 Eric Church, Clint Daniels, Jeff Hyde & Bobby Pinson, songwriters (Eric Church)
 "Speechless"
 Shay Mooney, Jordan Reynolds, Dan Smyers & Laura Veltz, songwriters (Dan + Shay)Best Country Album While I'm Livin' – Tanya Tucker Desperate Man – Eric Church
 Stronger Than the Truth – Reba McEntire
 Interstate Gospel – Pistol Annies
 Center Point Road – Thomas Rhett

 New age Best New Age Album Wings – Peter Kater Fairy Dreams – David Arkenstone
 Homage to Kindness – David Darling
 Verve – Sebastian Plano
 Deva – Deva Premal

 Jazz Best Improvised Jazz Solo "Sozinho" – Randy Brecker, soloist "Elsewhere" – Melissa Aldana, soloist
 "Tomorrow Is the Question" – Julian Lage, soloist
 "The Windup" – Branford Marsalis, soloist
 "Sightseeing" – Christian McBride, soloistBest Jazz Vocal Album12 Little Spells – Esperanza SpaldingThirsty Ghost – Sara Gazarek
Love & Liberation – Jazzmeia Horn
Alone Together – Catherine Russell
ScreenPlay – The Tierney Sutton BandBest Jazz Instrumental Album Finding Gabriel – Brad Mehldau In the Key of the Universe – Joey DeFrancesco
 The Secret Between the Shadow and the Soul – Branford Marsalis Quartet
 Christian McBride's New Jawn – Christian McBride
 Come What May – Joshua Redman QuartetBest Large Jazz Ensemble Album The Omni-American Book Club – Brian Lynch Big Band Triple Helix – Anat Cohen Tentet
 Dancer in Nowhere – Miho Hazama and m_unit
 Hiding Out – Mike Holober & The Gotham Jazz Orchestra
 One Day Wonder – Terraza Big BandBest Latin Jazz Album Antidote – Chick Corea & The Spanish Heart Band Sorte!: Music By John Finbury – Thalma de Freitas with Vítor Gonçalves, John Patitucci, Chico Pinheiro, Rogerio Boccato & Duduka Da Fonseca
 Una Noche con Rubén Blades – Jazz at Lincoln Center Orchestra with Wynton Marsalis & Rubén Blades
 Carib – David Sánchez
 Sonero: The Music of Ismael Rivera – Miguel Zenón

 Gospel/contemporary Christian music Best Gospel Performance/Song "Love Theory"Kirk Franklin, songwriter (Kirk Franklin) "Talkin' 'Bout Jesus"
 Bryan Fowler, Gloria Gaynor & Chris Stevens, songwriters (Gloria Gaynor featuring Yolanda Adams)
 "See the Light"
Travis Greene & Jekalyn Carr, songwriters (Travis Greene featuring Jekalyn Carr)
 "Speak the Name"
Koryn Hawthorne & Natalie Grant, songwriters (Koryn Hawthorne featuring Natalie Grant)
 "This Is a Move (Live)"
Tony Brown, Brandon Lake, Tasha Cobbs Leonard & Nate Moore, songwriters (Tasha Cobbs Leonard)Best Contemporary Christian Music Performance/Song "God Only Knows" Josh Kerr, Jordan Reynolds, Joel Smallbone, Luke Smallbone & Tedd Tjornhom, songwriters (for KING & COUNTRY & Dolly Parton) "Only Jesus"
Mark Hall, Bernie Herms & Matthew West, songwriters (Casting Crowns)
 "Haven't Seen It Yet"
Danny Gokey, Ethan Hulse & Colby Wedgeworth, songwriters (Danny Gokey)
 "God's Not Done with You (Single Version)"
Tauren Wells, songwriter (Tauren Wells)
 "Rescue Story"
 Ethan Hulse, Andrew Ripp, Jonathan Smith & Zach Williams, songwriters (Zach Williams)Best Gospel AlbumLong Live Love – Kirk FranklinGoshen Donald Lawrence Presents the Tri – City Singers
Tunnel Vision – Gene Moore
Settle Here – William Murphy
Something's Happening! A Christmas Album – CeCe WinansBest Contemporary Christian Music AlbumBurn the Ships – for KING & COUNTRYI Know a Ghost – Crowder
Haven't Seen It Yet – Danny Gokey
The Elements – TobyMac
Holy Roar – Chris TomlinBest Roots Gospel AlbumTestimony – Gloria GaynorDeeper Roots: Where the Bluegrass Grows – Steven Curtis Chapman
Deeper Oceans – Joseph Habedank
His Name Is Jesus – Tim Menzies
Gonna Sing, Gonna Shout – Various artists; Jerry Salley, producer

 Latin Best Latin Pop AlbumEl Disco – Alejandro SanzVida – Luis Fonsi
11:11 – Maluma
Montaner – Ricardo Montaner
Fantasía – Sebastian YatraBest Latin Rock, Urban or Alternative AlbumEl Mal Querer – RosalíaX 100pre – Bad Bunny
Oasis – J Balvin & Bad Bunny
Indestructible – Flor de Toloache
Almadura – iLeBest Regional Mexican Music Album (Including Tejano)De Ayer Para siempre – Mariachi los CamperosCaminado – Joss Favela
Percepcion – Intocable
Poco a Poco – La Energía Norteña
20 aniversario – Mariachi Divas de Cindy SheaBest Tropical Latin AlbumOpus – Marc Anthony (TIE)A Journey Through Cuban Music – Aymée Nuviola (TIE)Tiempo al Tiempo – Luis Enrique + C4 Trio
Candela – Vicente García
Literal – Juan Luis Guerra 4.40

 American roots Best American Roots Performance"Saint Honesty" – Sara Bareilles"Father Mountain" – Calexico and Iron & Wine
"I'm on My Way" – Rhiannon Giddens with Francesco Turrisi
"Call My Name" – I'm with Her
"Faraway Look" – YolaBest American Roots Song "Call My Name"Sarah Jarosz, Aoife O'Donovan & Sara Watkins, songwriters (I'm with Her) "Black Myself"
 Amythyst Kiah, songwriter (Our Native Daughters)
 "Crossing to Jerusalem"
 Rosanne Cash & John Leventhal, songwriters (Rosanne Cash)
 "Faraway Look"
 Dan Auerbach, Yola Carter & Pat McLaughlin, songwriters (Yola)
 "I Don't Wanna Ride the Rails No More"
 Vince Gill, songwriter (Vince Gill)Best Americana AlbumOklahoma – Keb' Mo'Years to Burn – Calexico and Iron & Wine
Who Are You Now – Madison Cunningham
Tales of America – J.S. Ondara
Walk Through Fire – YolaBest Bluegrass Album Tall Fiddler – Michael Cleveland Live in Prague, Czech Republic – Doyle Lawson & Quicksilver
 Toil, Tears & Trouble – The Po' Ramblin' Boys
 Royal Traveller – Missy Raines
 If You Can't Stand the Heat – Frank Solivan & Dirty KitchenBest Traditional Blues Album Tall, Dark, and Handsome – Delbert McClinton & Self-Made Men + Dana Kingfish – Christone "Kingfish" Ingram
 Sitting on Top of the Blues – Bobby Rush
 Baby, Please Come Home – Jimmie Vaughan
 Spectacular Class – Jontavious WillisBest Contemporary Blues Album This Land – Gary Clark Jr. Venom & Faith – Larkin Poe
 Brighter Days – Robert Randolph and the Family Band
 Somebody Save Me – Sugaray Rayford
 Keep On – Southern AvenueBest Folk Album Patty Griffin – Patty Griffin My Finest Work Yet – Andrew Bird
 Rearrange My Heart – Che Apalache
 Evening Machines – Gregory Alan Isakov
 Front Porch – Joy WilliamsBest Regional Roots Music Album Good Time – Ranky Tanky Kalawai‘anui – Amy Hānaialiʻi
 When It's Cold – Cree Round Dance Songs – Northern Cree
 Recorded Live at the 2019 New Orleans Jazz & Heritage Festival – Rebirth Brass Band
 Hawaiian Lullaby – Various artists; Imua Garza & Kimié Miner, producers

 Reggae Best Reggae Album Rapture – Koffee As I Am – Julian Marley
 The Final Battle: Sly & Robbie vs. Roots Radics – Sly and Robbie & Roots Radics
 Mass Manipulation – Steel Pulse
 More Work to Be Done – Third World

 World music Best World Music Album Celia – Angélique Kidjo Gece – Altın Gün
 What Heat – Bokanté & Metropole Orkest conducted by Jules Buckley
 African Giant – Burna Boy
 Fanm d'Ayiti – Nathalie Joachim with Spektral Quartet

 Children's Best Children's Album Ageless: Songs for the Child Archetype – Jon Samson Flying High! – Caspar Babypants
 I Love Rainy Days – Daniel Tashian
 The Love – Alphabet Rockers
 Winterland – The Okee Dokee Brothers

 Spoken word Best Spoken Word Album (Includes Poetry, Audio Books & Storytelling) Becoming – Michelle Obama Beastie Boys Book – Various artists; Michael Diamond, Adam Horovitz, Scott Sherratt & Dan Zitt, producers
 I.V. Catatonia: 20 Years as a Two-Time Cancer Survivor – Eric Alexandrakis
 Mr. Know-It-All – John Waters
 Sekou Andrews & The String Theory – Sekou Andrews & The String Theory

 Comedy Best Comedy Album Sticks & Stones – Dave Chappelle Quality Time – Jim Gaffigan
 Relatable – Ellen DeGeneres
 Right Now – Aziz Ansari
 Son of Patricia – Trevor Noah

 Musical theater Best Musical Theater Album Hadestown – Reeve Carney, André De Shields, Amber Gray, Eva Noblezada & Patrick Page, principal soloists; Mara Isaacs, David Lai, Anaïs Mitchell & Todd Sickafoose, producers (Anaïs Mitchell, composer & lyricist) (Original Broadway Cast) Ain't Too Proud: The Life and Times of The Temptations – Saint Aubyn, Derrick Baskin, James Harkness, Jawan M. Jackson, Jeremy Pope & Ephraim Sykes, principal soloists; Scott M. Riesett, producer (Original Broadway Cast)
 Moulin Rouge! The Musical – Danny Burstein, Tam Mutu, Sahr Ngaujah, Karen Olivo & Aaron Tveit, principal soloists; Justin Levine, Baz Luhrmann, Matt Stine & Alex Timbers, producers (Original Broadway Cast)
 The Music of Harry Potter and the Cursed Child – In Four Contemporary Suites – Imogen Heap, producer; Imogen Heap, composer (Imogen Heap)
 Oklahoma! – Damon Daunno, Rebecca Naomi Jones, Ali Stroker, Mary Testa & Patrick Vaill, principal soloists; Daniel Kluger & Dean Sharenow, producers (Richard Rodgers, composer; Oscar Hammerstein II, lyricist) (2019 Broadway Cast)

 Music for visual media Best Compilation Soundtrack for Visual Media A Star Is Born – Lady Gaga & Bradley Cooper Paul "DJWS" Blair, Bradley Cooper, Lady Gaga, Nick Monson, Lukas Nelson, Mark Nilan Jr. & Benjamin Rice, compilation producers; Julianne Jordan & Julia Michels, music supervisors The Lion King: The Songs – Various Artists
 Jon Favreau & Hans Zimmer, compilation producers
 Quentin Tarantino's Once Upon a Time in Hollywood – Various Artists
 Quentin Tarantino, compilation producer; Mary Ramos, music supervisor
 Rocketman – Taron Egerton
 Giles Martin, compilation producer
 Spider-Man: Into the Spider-Verse – Various Artists
 Spring Aspers & Dana Sano, compilation producers; Kier Lehman, music supervisorBest Score Soundtrack for Visual Media Chernobyl – Hildur Guðnadóttir, composer Avengers: Endgame – Alan Silvestri, composer
 Game of Thrones: Season 8 – Ramin Djawadi, composer
 The Lion King – Hans Zimmer, composer
 Mary Poppins Returns – Marc Shaiman, composerBest Song Written for Visual Media "I'll Never Love Again (Film Version)" (from A Star Is Born)
 Natalie Hemby, Lady Gaga, Hillary Lindsey & Aaron Raitiere, songwriters (Lady Gaga & Bradley Cooper)
 "The Ballad of the Lonesome Cowboy" (from Toy Story 4)
 Randy Newman, songwriter (Chris Stapleton)
 "Girl in the Movies" (from [[Dumplin' (film)|Dumplin]])
 Dolly Parton & Linda Perry, songwriters (Dolly Parton)
 "Spirit" (from The Lion King)
 Beyoncé Knowles-Carter, Timothy McKenzie & Ilya Salmanzadeh, songwriter (Beyoncé)
 "Suspirium" (from Suspiria)
 Thom Yorke, songwriter (Thom Yorke)

 Composing Best Instrumental Composition Star Wars: "Galaxy's Edge (Symphonic Suite)"John Williams, composer (John Williams) "Begin Again"
Fred Hersch, composer (Fred Hersch & The WDR Big Band Conducted by Vince Mendoza)
 "Crucible for Crisis"
Brian Lynch, composer (Brian Lynch Big Band)
 "Love, a Beautiful Force"
Vince Mendoza, composer (Vince Mendoza, Terell Stafford, Dick Oatts & Temple University Studio Orchestra)
 "Walkin' Funny"
Christian McBride, composer (Christian McBride)

 Arranging Best Arrangement, Instrumental or A Cappella "Moon River"Jacob Collier, arranger (Jacob Collier) "Blue Skies"
Kris Bowers, arranger (Kris Bowers)
 "Hedwig's Theme"
John Williams, arranger (Anne-Sophie Mutter & John Williams)
 "La Novena"
 Emilio Solla, arranger (Emilio Solla Tango Jazz Orchestra)
 "Love, a Beautiful Force"
Vince Mendoza, arranger (Vince Mendoza, Terell Stafford, Dick Oatts & Temple University Studio Orchestra)Best Arrangement, Instruments and Vocals "All Night Long" Jacob Collier, arranger (Jacob Collier featuring Jules Buckley, Take 6 & Metropole Orkest) "Jolene"
 Geoff Keezer, arranger (Sara Gazarek)
 "Marry Me a Little"
 Cyrille Aimee & Diego Figueiredo, arrangers (Cyrille Aimée)
 "Over the Rainbow"
 Vince Mendoza, arranger (Trisha Yearwood)
 "12 Little Spells (Thoracic Spine)"
 Esperanza Spalding, arranger (Esperanza Spalding)

 Package Best Recording PackageChris Cornell Barry Ament, Jeff Ament, Jeff Fura & Joe Spix, art directors (Chris Cornell)Anónimas & resilientes
 Luisa María Arango, Carlos Dussan, Manuel García-Orozco & Juliana Jaramillo-Buenaventura, art directors (Voces Del Bullerengue)
 Hold That Tiger
 Andrew Wong & Fongming Yang, art directors (The Muddy Basin Ramblers)
 I, I
 Aaron Anderson & Eric Timothy Carlson, art directors (Bon Iver)
 Intellexual
 Irwan Awalludin, art director (Intellexual)Best Boxed or Special Limited Edition Package Woodstock: Back to the Garden – The Definitive 50th Anniversary Archive Masaki Koike, art director (Various artists) Anima
 Stanley Donwood & Tchocky, art directors (Thom Yorke)
 Gold in Brass Age
 Amanda Chiu, Mark Farrow & David Gray, art directors (David Gray)
 1963: New Directions
 Josh Cheuse, art director (John Coltrane)
 The Radio Recordings 1939–1945
 Marek Polewski, art director (Wilhelm Furtwängler & Berliner Philharmoniker)

 Notes Best Album Notes Stax '68: A Memphis Story Steve Greenberg, album notes writer (Various artists) The Complete Cuban Jam Sessions
 Judy Cantor-Navas, album notes writer (Various artists)
 The Gospel According to Malaco
 Robert Marovich, album notes writer (Various artists)
 Pedal Steel + Four Corners
 Brendan Greaves, album notes writer (Terry Allen And The Panhandle Mystery Band)
 Pete Seeger: The Smithsonian Folkways Collection
 Jeff Place, album notes writer (Pete Seeger)

 Historical Best Historical Album Pete Seeger: The Smithsonian Folkways Collection Jeff Place & Robert Santelli, compilation producers; Pete Reiniger, mastering engineer (Pete Seeger) The Girl from Chickasaw County – The Complete Capitol Masters
 Andrew Batt & Kris Maher, compilation producers; Simon Gibson, mastering engineer (Bobbie Gentry)
 The Great Comeback: Horowitz at Carnegie Hall
 Robert Russ, compilation producer; Andreas K. Meyer & Jennifer Nulsen, mastering engineers (Vladimir Horowitz)
 Kanyo Ongaku: Japanese Ambient, Environmental & New Age Music 1980–1990
 Spencer Doran, Yosuke Kitazawa, Douglas Mcgowan & Matt Sullivan, compilation producers; John Baldwin, mastering engineer (Various artists)
 Woodstock: Back to the Garden – The Definitive 50th Anniversary Archive
 Brian Kehew, Steve Woolard & Andy Zax, compilation producers; Dave Schultz, mastering engineer (Various artists)

 Production, non-classical Best Engineered Album, Non-Classical When We All Fall Asleep, Where Do We Go? Rob Kinelski & Finneas O'Connell, engineers; John Greenham, mastering engineer (Billie Eilish) All These Things
 Tchad Blake, Adam Greenspan & Roderick Shearer, engineers; Bernie Grundman, mastering engineer (Thomas Dybdahl)
 Ella Mai
 Chris "Shaggy" Ascher, Jaycen Joshua & David Pizzimenti, engineers; Chris Athens, mastering engineer (Ella Mai)
 Run Home Slow
 Paul Butler & Sam Teskey, engineers; Joe Carra, mastering engineer (The Teskey Brothers)
 Scenery
 Tom Elmhirst, Ben Kane & Jeremy Most, engineers; Bob Ludwig, mastering engineer (Emily King)Producer of the Year, Non-ClassicalFinneasWhen We All Fall Asleep, Where Do We Go? (Billie Eilish)
 Jack Antonoff
Arizona Baby (Kevin Abstract) 
Lover (Taylor Swift) 
Norman F***ing Rockwell! (Lana Del Rey) 
Red Hearse (Red Hearse) 
 Dan Auerbach
The Angels in Heaven Done Signed My Name (Leo Bud Welch) 
"Let's Rock" (The Black Keys) 
Mockingbird (The Gibson Brothers) 
Myth of a Man (Night Beats) 
Southern Gentleman (Dee White) 
Walk Through Fire (Yola) 
 John Hill
"Heat of the Summer" (Young The Giant) 
"Hundred" (Khalid) 
"No Drug like Me" (Carly Rae Jepsen) 
"Outta My Head" (Khalid With John Mayer) 
Social Cues (Cage The Elephant) 
"Superposition" (Young The Giant) 
"Too Much" (Carly Rae Jepsen) 
"Vertigo" (Khalid) 
"Zero" (from Ralph Breaks the Internet) (Imagine Dragons)
 Ricky Reed
Almost Free (Fidlar) 
"Burning" (Maggie Rogers) 
"Confidence" (X Ambassadors featuring K.Flay) 
"Juice" (Lizzo) 
"Kingdom of One" (Maren Morris) 
"Power Is Power" (SZA featuring The Weeknd & Travis Scott) 
"Tempo" (Lizzo featuring Missy Elliott)
"Truth Hurts" (Lizzo) 
The Wrong Man (Ross Golan)Best Remixed Recording "I Rise" (Tracy Young's Pride Intro Radio Remix)Tracy Young, remixer (Madonna) "Mother's Daughter" (Wuki Remix)
Wuki, remixer (Miley Cyrus)
 "The One" (High Contrast Remix)
 Lincoln Barrett, remixer (Jorja Smith)
 "Swim" (Ford. Remix)
 Luc Bradford, remixer (Mild Minds)
 "Work It" (Soulwax Remix)
 David Gerard C Dewaele & Stephen Antoine C Dewaele, remixers (Marie Davidson)

 Production, immersive audio Best Immersive Audio AlbumLuxMorten Lindberg, immersive audio engineer; Morten Lindberg, immersive audio mastering engineer; Morten Lindberg, immersive audio producer (Anita Brevik, Trondheimsolistene & Nidarosdomens Jentekor)Chain Tripping
Luke Argilla, immersive audio engineer; Jurgen Scharpf, immersive audio mastering engineer; Jona Bechtolt, Claire L. Evans & Rob Kieswetter, immersive audio producers (Yacht)
Kverndokk: Symphonic Dances
Jim Anderson, immersive audio engineer; Robert C. Ludwig, immersive audio mastering engineer; Ulrike Schwarz, immersive audio producer (Ken-David Masur & Stavanger Symphony Orchestra)
The Orchestral Organ
Keith O. Johnson, immersive audio engineer; Keith O. Johnson, immersive audio mastering engineer; Marina A. Ledin & Victor Ledin, immersive audio producers (Jan Kraybill)
The Savior
Bob Clearmountain, immersive audio engineer; Bob Ludwig, immersive audio mastering engineer; Michael Marquart & Dave Way, immersive audio producers (A Bad Think)

 Production, classical Best Engineered Album, ClassicalRiley: Sun RingsLeslie Ann Jones, engineer; Robert C. Ludwig, mastering engineer (Kronos Quartet)Aequa – Anna Thorvaldsdóttir
Daniel Shores, engineer; Daniel Shores, mastering engineer (International Contemporary Ensemble)
Bruckner: Symphony No. 9
Mark Donahue, engineer; Mark Donahue, mastering engineer (Manfred Honeck & Pittsburgh Symphony Orchestra)
Rachmaninoff – Hermitage Piano Trio
Keith O. Johnson & Sean Royce Martin, engineers; Keith O. Johnson, mastering engineer (Hermitage Piano Trio)
Wolfe: Fire in My Mouth
Bob Hanlon & Lawrence Rock, engineers; Ian Good & Lawrence Rock, mastering engineers (Jaap Van Zweden, Francisco J. Núñez, Donald Nally, The Crossing, Young People's Chorus of NY City & New York Philharmonic)Producer of the Year, Classical Blanton AlspaughArtifacts – The Music of Michael McGlynn (Charles Bruffy & Kansas City Chorale)
Berlioz: Symphonie fantastique; Fantaisie sur La Tempête de Shakespeare (Andrew Davis & Toronto Symphony Orchestra)
Copland: Billy the Kid; Grohg (Leonard Slatkin & Detroit Symphony Orchestra)
Duruflé: Complete Choral Works (Robert Simpson & Houston Chamber Choir)
Glass: Symphony No. 5 (Julian Wachner, The Choir Of Trinity Wall Street, Trinity Youth Chorus, Downtown Voices & Novus NY)
Sander: The Divine Liturgy of St. John Chrysostom (Peter Jermihov & PaTRAM Institute Singers)
Smith, K.: Canticle (Craig Hella Johnson & Cincinnati Vocal Arts Ensemble)
Visions Take Flight (Mei-Ann Chen & ROCO)
 James Ginsburg
Project W – Works by Diverse Women Composers (Mei-Ann Chen & Chicago Sinfonietta)
Silenced Voices (Black Oak Ensemble)
20th Century Harpsichord Concertos (Jory Vinikour, Scott Speck & Chicago Philharmonic)
Twentieth Century Oboe Sonatas (Alex Klein & Phillip Bush)
Winged Creatures & Other Works for Flute, Clarinet, and Orchestra (Anthony McGill, Demarre McGill, Allen Tinkham & Chicago Youth Symphony Orchestra)
 Marina A. Ledin & Victor Ledin
Bates: Children of Adam; Vaughan Williams: Dona nobis pacem (Steven Smith, Erin R. Freeman, Richmond Symphony & Chorus)
The Orchestral Organ (Jan Kraybill)
The Poetry of Places (Nadia Shpachenko)
Rachmaninoff – Hermitage Piano Trio (Hermitage Piano Trio)
 Morten Lindberg
Himmelborgen (Elisabeth Holte, Kåre Nordstoga & Uranienborg Vokalensemble)
Kleiberg: Do You Believe in Heather? (Various artists)
Ljos (Fauna Vokalkvintett)
LUX (Anita Brevik, Trondheimsolistene & Nidarosdomens Jentekor)
Trachea (Tone Bianca Sparre Dahl & Schola Cantorum)
Veneliti (Håkon Daniel Nystedt & Oslo Kammerkor)
 Dirk Sobotka
Bruckner: Symphony No. 9 (Manfred Honeck & Pittsburgh Symphony Orchestra)

Classical
Best Orchestral Performance
 Norman: SustainGustavo Dudamel, conductor (Los Angeles Philharmonic) Bruckner: Symphony No. 9
Manfred Honeck, conductor (Pittsburgh Symphony Orchestra)
 Copland: Billy the Kid; Grohg
Leonard Slatkin, conductor (Detroit Symphony Orchestra)
Transatlantic
Louis Langrée, conductor (Cincinnati Symphony Orchestra)
Weinberg: Symphonies Nos. 2 & 21
Mirga Gražinytė-Tyla, conductor (City of Birmingham Symphony Orchestra & Kremerata Baltica)Best Opera RecordingPicker: Fantastic Mr. FoxGil Rose, conductor; John Brancy, Andrew Craig Brown, Gabriel Preisser, Krista River & Edwin Vega; Gil Rose, producer (Boston Modern Orchestra Project; Boston Children's Chorus)Benjamin: Lessons in Love & Violence
George Benjamin, conductor; Stéphane Degout, Barbara Hannigan, Peter Hoare & Gyula Orendt; James Whitbourn, producer (Orchestra of the Royal Opera House)
Berg: Wozzeck
Marc Albrecht, conductor; Christopher Maltman & Eva-Maria Westbroek; François Roussillon, producer (Netherlands Philharmonic Orchestra; Chorus of Dutch National Opera)
Charpentier: Les Arts florissants; Les Plaisirs de Versailles
Paul O'Dette & Stephen Stubbs, conductors; Jesse Blumberg, Teresa Wakim & Virginia Warnken; Renate Wolter-Seevers, producer (Boston Early Music Festival Chamber Ensemble; Boston Early Music Festival Vocal Ensemble)
Wagner: Lohengrin
Christian Thielemann, conductor; Piotr Beczała, Anja Harteros, Tomasz Konieczny, Waltraud Meier & Georg Zeppenfeld; Eckhard Glauche, producer (Festspielorchester Bayreuth; Festspielchor Bayreuth)Best Choral PerformanceDuruflé: Complete Choral WorksRobert Simpson, conductor (Ken Cowan; Houston Chamber Choir)Boyle: Voyages
Donald Nally, conductor (The Crossing)
The Hope of Loving
Craig Hella Johnson, conductor (Conspirare)
Sander: The Divine Liturgy of St. John Chrysostom
Peter Jermihov, conductor (Evan Bravos, Vadim Gan, Kevin Keys, Glenn Miller & Daniel Shirley; PaTRAM Institute Singers)
Smith, K.: The Arc in the Sky
Donald Nally, conductor (The Crossing)Best Chamber Music/Small Ensemble PerformanceShaw: Orange – Attacca QuartetCerrone: The Pieces That Fall to Earth – Christopher Rountree & Wild Up
Freedom & Faith – PUBLIQuartet
Perpetulum – Third Coast Percussion
Rachmaninoff – Hermitage Piano Trio – Hermitage Piano TrioBest Classical Instrumental SoloMarsalis: Violin Concerto; Fiddle Dance SuiteNicola Benedetti; Cristian Măcelaru, conductor (Philadelphia Orchestra)The Berlin Recital
Yuja Wang
Higdon: Harp Concerto
Yolanda Kondonassis; Ward Stare, conductor (The Rochester Philharmonic Orchestra)
The Orchestral Organ
Jan Kraybill
Torke: Sky, Concerto for Violin
Tessa Lark; David Alan Miller, conductor (Albany Symphony)Best Classical Solo Vocal AlbumSongplayJoyce DiDonato; Chuck Israels, Jimmy Madison, Charlie Porter & Craig Terry, accompanists (Steve Barnett & Lautaro Greco)The Edge of Silence – Works for Voice by György Kurtág
Susan Narucki (Donald Berman, Curtis Macomber, Kathryn Schulmeister & Nicholas Tolle)
Himmelsmusik
Philippe Jaroussky & Céline Scheen; Christina Pluhar, conductor; L'Arpeggiata, ensemble (Jesús Rodil & Dingle Yandell)
Schumann: Liederkreis Op. 24, Kerner-Lieder Op. 35
Matthias Goerne; Leif Ove Andsnes, accompanist
A te, o cara
Stephen Costello; Constantine Orbelian, conductor (Kaunas City Symphony Orchestra)Best Classical CompendiumThe Poetry of PlacesNadia Shpachenko; Marina A. Ledin & Victor Ledin, producersAmerican Originals 1918
John Morris Russell, conductor; Elaine Martone, producer
Leshnoff: Symphony No. 4 "Heichalos"; Guitar Concerto; Starburst
Giancarlo Guerrero, conductor; Tim Handley, producer
Meltzer: Songs and Structures
Paul Appleby & Natalia Katyukova; Silas Brown & Harold Meltzer, producers
Saariaho: True Fire; Trans; Ciel d'hiver
Hannu Lintu, conductor; Laura Heikinheimo, producerBest Contemporary Classical CompositionHigdon: Harp ConcertoJennifer Higdon, composer (Yolanda Kondonassis, Ward Stare & The Rochester Philharmonic Orchestra)Bermel: Migration Series for Jazz Ensemble & Orchestra
Derek Bermel, composer (Derek Bermel, Ted Nash, David Alan Miller, Juilliard Jazz Orchestra & Albany Symphony Orchestra)
Marsalis: Violin Concerto in D Major
Wynton Marsalis, composer (Nicola Benedetti, Cristian Măcelaru & Philadelphia Orchestra)
Norman: Sustain
Andrew Norman, composer (Gustavo Dudamel & Los Angeles Philharmonic)
Shaw: Orange
Caroline Shaw, composer (Attacca Quartet)
Wolfe: Fire in My Mouth
Julia Wolfe, composer (Jaap Van Zweden, Francisco J. Núñez, Donald Nally, The Crossing, Young People's Chorus of NY City & New York Philharmonic)

 Music video/film Best Music Video"Old Town Road" (Official Movie)  – Lil Nas X & Billy Ray CyrusCalmatic, video director; Candice Dragonas, Melissa Larsen & Saul Levitz, video producers"We've Got to Try" – The Chemical Brothers
Ninian Doff, video director; Ellie Fry, video producer
"This Land" – Gary Clark Jr. 
Savanah Leaf, video director; Jason Cole, Danielle Hinde, Alicia Martinez & Devin Sarno, video producers, video producers
"Cellophane" – FKA Twigs 
Andrew Thomas Huang, video director; Alex Chamberlain, video producer
 "Glad He's Gone" – Tove Lo
Vania Heymann & Gal Muggia: video directors; Natan Schottenfels: video producerBest Music Film Homecoming – Beyoncé Beyoncé Knowles-Carter & Ed Burke, video directors; Steve Pamon & Erinn Williams, video producers'''
 David Crosby: Remember My Name – David Crosby
 A.J. Eaton, video director; Cameron Crowe, Michele Farinola & Greg Mariotti, video producers
 Miles Davis: Birth of the Cool – Miles Davis
 Stanley Nelson, video director; Nicole London, video producer
 Shangri-La – Various artists
 Morgan Neville, video director; Emma Baiada, video producer
 Anima – Thom Yorke
 Paul Thomas Anderson, video director; Paul Thomas Anderson, Erica Frauman & Sara Murphy, video producers

 Special Merit Awards 
 MusiCares Person of the Year 
 Aerosmith

 Lifetime Achievement Award 
 Chicago
 Roberta Flack
 Isaac Hayes
 Iggy Pop
 John Prine
 Public Enemy
 Sister Rosetta Tharpe

 Trustees Award 
 Ken Ehrlich
 Philip Glass
 Frank Walker

 Technical Grammy Award 
 George Augspurger

 Music Educator Award 
 Mickey Smith Jr. (Maplewood Middle School in Sulphur, Louisiana)

Multiple nominations and awards

American singer Lizzo received the most nominations, with a total of eight. She was followed by Billie Eilish and Lil Nas X, who both received six nominations each. The following received multiple nominations:Eight:LizzoSix:Billie Eilish
Finneas
Lil Nas XFive:Ariana Grande
H.E.R.Four:Beyoncé
Gary Clark Jr.
J. Cole
Lucky Daye
Bob Ludwig
Ricky Reed
Tanya Tucker
Yola
Thom YorkeThree:Jack Antonoff
Brandi Carlile
The Chemical Brothers
Billy Ray Cyrus
Lady Gaga
Chris Gehringer
John Greenham
David "Swagg R'celious" Harris
Nipsey Hussle
Bon Iver
Rob Kinelski
Ezra Koenig
Marina A. Ledin & Victor Ledin
Hillary Lindsey
Manny Marroquin
Christian McBride
Vince Mendoza
PJ Morton
Roddy Ricch
Taylor SwiftTwo:Sam Ashworth
Dan Auerbach
Bad Bunny
BJ the Chicago Kid
Tommy Brown
BJ Burton
Greg Calbi
Calexico
Eric Church
Jacob Collier
Brad Cook
YBN Cordae
DaBaby
Dan + Shay
Lana Del Rey
D'Mile
Drake
Dreamville
For King & Country
Kirk Franklin
Gloria Gaynor
Serban Ghenea
Danny Gokey
Joe Grasso
Phil Hanseroth
Tim Hanseroth
Zach Hansen
Natalie Hemby
Hit-Boy
Brittany Howard
Ethan Hulse
I Prevail
Ilya
I'm With Her
Iron & Wine
Rodney Jerkins
Keith O. Johnson
Jaycen Joshua
Eric Lagg
Miranda Lambert
Swae Lee
John Legend
Morten Lindberg
Brian Lynch
Post Malone
Branford Marsalis
Wynton Marsalis
Ashley McBryde
Lori McKenna
Randy Merrill
Chris Messina
Victoria Monet
Brendan Morawski
Jeremy Most
Donald Nally
Anderson .Paak
Dolly Parton
Jordan Reynolds
Rival Sons
Rosalía
Rüfüs Du Sol
Ethan Shumaker
Social House
Esperanza Spalding
Tool
Miki Tsutsumi
21 Savage
Vampire Weekend
Vinylz
John Williams
Hans Zimmer

Billie Eilish and her brother Finneas received the most awards for their work on Eilish's debut album When We All Fall Asleep, Where Do We Go?, with five wins for Billie Eilish and six wins for Finneas. Upon this, Eilish became the first artist to win the major four categories of Record of the Year, Album of the Year, Song of the Year, and Best New Artist in the same year since Christopher Cross in 1981 as well as the youngest artist to do so at the age of 18. The following received multiple awards:Six:FinneasFive:Billie EilishThree:Gary Clark Jr.
John Greenham
Rob Kinelski
LizzoTwo:''
The Chemical Brothers
Jacob Collier
Billy Ray Cyrus
For King & Country
Kirk Franklin
Lady Gaga
Nipsey Hussle
Lil Nas X
Anderson .Paak
Tanya Tucker

In Memoriam

A memorial reel featuring the names of musical artists and industry personnel who had died since the previous year's Grammy ceremony was shown during the telecast. The Recording Academy was criticized for omitting notable artists such as David Berman, Mark Hollis, Keith Flint, Bushwick Bill, Scott Walker, Ranking Roger and Robert Hunter during the telecast, but all were mentioned in a longer list of deceased artists on the Grammys website. Ric Ocasek and Camilo Sesto's names were also misspelled in the reel shown during the broadcast.

The individuals listed in the reel, in order of appearance, were:

 Nipsey Hussle
 Juice WRLD
 LaShawn Daniels
 Diahann Carroll
 Doris Day
 Neil Peart
 Ric Ocasek
 Eddie Money
 Ginger Baker
 Hal Blaine
 Emil Richards
 Marie Fredriksson
 Kim Shattuck
 Clydie King
 Katreese Barnes
 Leon Redbone
 Earl Thomas Conley
 Fred Foster
 David Olney
 Phran Galante
 Russell Smith
 Ralph Murphy
 Busbee
 João Gilberto
 José José
 Camilo Sesto
 Beth Carvalho
 Alberto Cortez
 Dan Warner
 Roky Erickson
 Daniel Johnston
 Dick Dale
 Donnie Fritts
 Ed Cherney
 Dave Velte
 Peter Tork
 Neil Innes
 Jimmy Heath
 Jimmy Johnson
 Jack Sheldon
 Jerry Herman
 Hal Prince
 Hugh Fordin
 Elliot Roberts
 Lauren Valencia
 Alex Berdoff
 Allee Willis
 Gary Lemel
 Jessye Norman
 Dominick Argento
 Jack Renner
 André Previn
 Joe Smith
 Jay Frank
 David Saltz
 Eddie Lambert
 Shelley Lazar
 Jim Swindel
 Gary Stewart
 Theresa Jenkins
 Dennis Farnon
 Dave Bartholomew
 Art Neville
 Dr. John

References

External links
 

 062
2020 in American music
2020 music awards
2020 in Los Angeles
January 2020 events in the United States
2020 awards in the United States